Chalchas is a genus of South American beetles in the family Melyridae, very commonly misspelled as Chalcas (e.g.).

Species
 Chalchas bremei Fairmaire, 1847
 Chalchas cyaneus Fairmaire, 1847
 Chalchas fairmairei Bourgeois, 1900
 Chalchas fumatus Fairmaire, 1849
 Chalchas humeralis Fairmaire, 1847
 Chalchas lajoyei Pic, 1919
 Chalchas lateralis Fairmaire, 1847
 Chalchas lineatocollis Fairmaire, 1847
 Chalchas lugubris Fairmaire, 1849
 Chalchas obesus Fairmaire, 1847
 Chalchas plicatus Pic, 1919
 Chalchas sallei Fairmaire, 1878
 Chalchas sexplagiatus Fairmaire, 1847
 Chalchas suturalis Pic, 1921
 Chalchas trabeatus Fairmaire, 1847
 Chalchas turgidus Erichson, 1848
 Chalchas unicolor Fairmaire, 1847

References

Melyridae
Cleroidea genera